Cost-effective minimum water network is a holistic framework for water conservation which considers all conceivable methods to save water based on the water management hierarchy.  

This framework, which is applicable for industrial as well as urban systems was first developed by Wan Alwi and Manan.  The framework is applicable for grassroots design and retrofit of water systems and ensures that a desired payback period for design of a water recovery system is satisfied using the systematic hierarchical approach for resilient process screening (SHARPS) technique.

References

See also
Water cascade analysis
Water pinch
Water conservation
Water reuse

Water conservation